Victor Socaciu (14 January 1953 – 27 December 2021) was a Romanian folk singer, composer and politician who served as a Deputy in the Parliament of Romania between 2008 and 2012, representative of Social Democrat Party. In 2014 he was named as General Consul of Romania in Canada, Montreal by the Romanian Government Decision nr.213/2014.

He died on 27 December 2021, at the age of 68.

References

External links
 

1953 births
2021 deaths
People from Brașov
Romanian folk singers
Members of the Chamber of Deputies (Romania)
Social Democratic Party (Romania) politicians
Recipients of the Order of Cultural Merit (Romania)